The Men's team pursuit competition at the 2023 World Single Distances Speed Skating Championships was held on 3 March 2023.

Results
The race was started at 19:30.

References

Men's team pursuit